Abhigyan Prakash is Senior Executive Editor of ABP News. and columnist. He is also an Op-ed columnist for the Hindi newspaper Dainik Jagran. Prakash was on the prize jury of the November 2013 Press Council of India "National Awards for Excellence in Journalism" given to deserving journalists. In New Delhi World Book Fair 2014, Abhigyan launched the book Development and Communication Morphosis authored by Gaurav Sharma.

Career
A reporter since 1994 and a key anchor since 1997 Abhigyan has been first on the English platform and later made a full-time switch to Hindi anchoring in 2003. All of Abhigyan Prakash‘s regularly presented shows have won every major television award from Jai Jawan to India Rocks to Newspoint and Maha Mukabala. Including many other coveted recognitions. Abhigyan‘s commitment to truth and objectivity has been unquestioned, uncompromised. In 2003 from Mumbai he led his team to break the Telgi scam which launched NDTV India and won the President’s medal. Over a decade ago when Society magazine choose him as one of the top young achievers in the country. They complimented Abhigyan Prakash‘s uniqueness in his ability to question stalwarts from the field of politics to cinema to sports and industry with effortless ease.

The media icon with a rich baritone has been impeccable with his delivery in both English and Hindi. Abhigyan began his career with newspapers like Times of India and The Pioneer. And later became reporter and anchor for Star News then produced by NDTV. He hosted key shows for Star News in English. And when he launched NDTV India from Mumbai for the Western Region he made full-time commitment to Hindi leading with the channel’s top rated show Mumbai Central hosted from Mumbai. Thus becoming one of the top bilingual presenters in the country.

A charismatic anchor and an astute political analyst. Abhigyan Prakash has done live election analysis for every state and parliamentary elections since 1996. Interviewing Prime Ministers and top leaders. Abhigyan Prakash‘s style of presentation is direct, honest and credible. Not being loud or gaudy Abhigyan Prakash is one of those personalities who gives speakers fair and equal chance of speaking and is widely known for his sharp witt. With his expertise on Indian Politics he has done many specialized election shows like Election Point and Vote Ki Jung.

As a team leader for NDTV India. Abhigyan has led the team of anchors for nearly a decade and groomed those who are now key faces of the channel. Along with national issues, his last 5 years focus of his hugely popular show NEWSPOINT and MUKABALA has been political economy and farmer’s plight. A reporter at heart Abhigyan has traveled with these shows reporting from metros, small town India and far flung rural areas. Highlighting issues of inflation, power, health and farmer’s distress.
A champion of free expression. Abhigyan Prakash is also an op-ed columnist for leading publications like Dainik Bhaskar, Outlook, Dainik Jagran and The Pioneer. His ethical and direct approach has coined a new term in journalism Abhigyantah, seen by many as renaissance of Hindi journalism. Abhigyantah is now his blog in Hindi where his daily editorials "Abhigyan Ka Point" on his show News point and columns in leading publications appear. And Abhigyanism is his blog in English on the same lines.

References

External links 

Living people
Date of birth missing (living people)
Indian male television journalists
Indian editors
Indian columnists
Indian television talk show hosts
20th-century Indian journalists
Indian male journalists
Indian political journalists
Year of birth missing (living people)